Santos "Vasquito" Urdinarán Barrena (30 March 1900 – 14 July 1979), known as El Vasquito, was a footballer from Uruguay. He played for Nacional from 1919 to 1933 (318 matches and 124 goals), playing the position of right winger. He was born and died in Montevideo.

He also played 20 matches and scored 2 goals for the Uruguay national football team. With the national team, he won the 1930 FIFA World Cup (without playing the final), two Olympic titles (1924 and 1928), and three Copa Americas (in 1923, 1924 and 1926).

Honours
Nacional
 Primera División (6): 1919, 1920, 1922, 1923, 1924, 1933
 Copa Competencia (3): 1919, 1921, 1923

Uruguay
 FIFA World Cup (1): 1930
 South American Championship (3): 1923, 1924, 1926
 Summer Olympics (2): 1924, 1928

References

External links

1900 births
1930 FIFA World Cup players
1979 deaths
Uruguayan people of Basque descent
Footballers from Montevideo
Uruguayan footballers
Uruguayan Primera División players
Club Nacional de Football players
Uruguay international footballers
Olympic footballers of Uruguay
Footballers at the 1924 Summer Olympics
Footballers at the 1928 Summer Olympics
Olympic gold medalists for Uruguay
FIFA World Cup-winning players
Olympic medalists in football
Copa América-winning players

Medalists at the 1928 Summer Olympics
Medalists at the 1924 Summer Olympics
Association football forwards